The People's Choice Awards for Favorite Hip Hop Artist has been awarded since 2010.

The all-time winner in this category is Eminem with 3 wins.

Hip Hop Artist